Gravedale High (also known as Rick Moranis in Gravedale High) is an animated series produced by Hanna-Barbera for NBC Productions (the latter company owns all rights to the series). The series premiered in the fall of 1990 on NBC as part of its Saturday morning children's lineup and lasted thirteen episodes.

The show was developed as an animated vehicle for Moranis, building on his star appearances in the series of Ghostbusters and Honey, I Shrunk the Kids film franchises.

Premise
The show revolves around the misadventures of human teacher Max Schneider who has unwittingly taken a job at Gravedale High, a school for monsters, near the city of Midtown. Schneider, the only human in the school, presides over a group of ghoulish teenagers that are latest-generation versions of classic movie monsters.

Most are either disruptive, uninterested, and/or unduly self-preoccupied in school, and the class is generally considered disreputable if not uncontrollable (not unlike "the Sweathogs" in Welcome Back, Kotter), the implication being Schneider was hired to teach the class because no monster teacher would take the job.

The actual "town" of Gravedale is occasionally seen and consists primarily of various cemeteries including the Eastside Cemetery and the Midtown Mausoleum. It can thus arguably be considered a "suburb" of Midtown, although few humans seem to know of its existence. In addition to the students' homes, it is known to include a doctor's office (which is run by a medical version of Dr. Jekyll and Mr. Hyde as seen in "Fear of Flying") and a literal body shop where people can purchase parts to assemble monsters. The existence of a charitable organization known as the United Monster Fund (dedicated to helping schools like Gravedale High "around the world") indicates Gravedale is part of an entire monster subculture.

Characters

Main characters
 Maxwell Schneider (voiced by Rick Moranis) - A human teacher in his late 30s to early 40s. Slight frame and very thin physique. Very much the grown up nerd and very proud of being a teacher who can make a difference. Dresses in a plain preppy business suit attire. He always wears a polka-dotted bow tie and thick dark horn-rimmed glasses, and he has wavy auburn hair and warm brown eyes. His personality is quirky but very steady (it has to be, given his being in charge of his motley young crew); friendly, fun, open-minded, and one of the hardest-working teachers on the Gravedale High staff. He would be just like one of the monsters if he was not human. A dedicated instructor who truly cares for each of his students.
 Vinnie Stoker (voiced by Roger Rose) - A vampire who is a Fonz-esque version of Count Dracula. His name is an homage to Bram Stoker and the commonality in fiction of giving vampires names that begin with V. He dresses like a 1950s greaser and often arrives late to class, which stems more from his lack of interest in academia than nocturnal habits. This is source of much debate between Schneider and Vinnie, who spends a lot of his time keeping Vinnie's boots off his desk. Vinnie is lazy by nature, but will do "studious things" or hard work if it serves his best interest.
 Frankentyke (voiced by Frank Welker) - A child reminiscent of both Frankenstein's Monster and Bart Simpson (to the extent that he addresses everyone as "man"). His short stature is the antithesis of the classic image of a hulking, frightening monster. As seen in Night of the Living Dad, his father is a human scientist who evidently created him; he apparently has no mother.
 Reggie Moonshroud (voiced by Barry Gordon) - A geeky red-haired werewolf, Reggie is prone to shedding a great deal when nervous, and may sometimes howl, but generally has his emotions under control (contrasting the image of werewolves having carnal instincts). As a nod to Richie Cunningham from Happy Days, he and the Fonz-like Vinnie are best friends, which also  embodies the antithesis of the classic monster movie genre, which often depicts werewolves and vampires as mortal enemies.
 J.P. Ghastly III (voiced by Frank Welker impersonating Peter Lorre) - A wealthy blue-skinned gnome-like monster. Sid once referred to him as a "quirk." His monster classification is unidentified. There is a bit of rivalry between him and Vinnie.
 Gill Waterman (voiced by Jackie Earle Haley) - A lagoon creature and surfer dude. His name is a pun on both terms, and he overuses surfer lingo. Best friends with Frankentyke, Gill likes to surf, idolizes famed surfer Kahuna Bob, and has a voracious appetite. As seen in Night of the Living Dad, Gil's parents dress in attire associated with the aristocracy of the Southern United States (perhaps as a nod to the Black Lagoon's location in South America), but Mr. Waterman shares his son's fondness for surfer lingo.
 Cleofatra (voiced by Ricki Lake) - An obese and somewhat nerdy mummy in contrast to the emaciated appearance generally associated with mummies. Her name is usually abbreviated as "Cleo." Best friends with Duzer. Cleofatra has a crush on TV monster celebrity Billy Headstone who is the star of the daytime soap opera "Trudy and the Beast" (which is a parody of the 1980s show Beauty and the Beast).
 Sid (voiced by Maurice LaMarche) - A student based on The Invisible Man. Sid is the class clown and does various impersonations (implying that perhaps his creation and name were inspired by Sid Caesar). He draws attention to himself with his antics as opposed to going unnoticed. Oddly, like many cartoon anthropomorphic animals, Sid apparently does not wear pants, unless his pants are invisible, as the rest of his wardrobe is not. Sid's parents are also talented impersonators as seen in the episode "Night of the Living Dad."
 Blanche (voiced by Shari Belafonte) - A zombie Southern belle who loves to shop,  a literal "mall zombie." Her name and personality comprise a pun on the verb form of  "blanche" as a synonym for turning pale, 'carte blanche', and Blanche DuBois (in the episode "Monster Gumbo", she comments that she has "always depended on the kindness of monsters" parodying a line from A Streetcar Named Desire). Blanche frequently dates J.P., although it is implied she finds his money to be his most attractive asset. Blanche is a shopaholic who is frequently teased by her classmates about how many credit cards she has maxed out. She is a bit of a clothes horse. She does sew her own clothes and can cook, though she does not like domestic duties; her ambition being to marry the richest monster in the world. J.P.'s ambition, in turn, is to be the richest monster in the world.
 Duzer (voiced by Kimmy Robertson) - A snake-haired gorgon Valley girl and parody and namesake of Medusa ("Duzer" is her nickname) minus the petrifying gaze. Her response to anyone who annoys her is "Get a life!" which is ironic in that many Gravedale students and staff members are in fact already dead. She is very pretty, vain, competitive, bossy, and likes to be the boys' center of attention, particularly that of Vinnie, who she seems to have an unrequited crush on. In the first episode, Duzer replies that she cannot do anything with her snake hair and Cleo offers to help her "get her hair ready for Vinnie."  Duzer states that she does not have a crush on Vinnie Stoker. Frankentyke swipes her diary off her desk and reads out loud a passage about that reveals otherwise. Schneider enters the classroom just as Duzer gives chase and states that Frankentyke took her diary. Tyke throws the evidence out the window. Vinnie flies into the window with said diary and tries to read it before Duzer yells at him "If you read that, you're dead." Beyond this, there was no mention of Duzer and Vinnie's relationship in the series.

Other students
Other recurring students include:

 Alpha-Mae Centauri - A centaur.
 Blobby - A student reminiscent of The Blob.
 Busby - A human fly.
 Elephant Boy (voiced by Frank Welker) - An elephantine parody of the Elephant Man. He speaks with Received Pronunciation. One of two students who campaigned vigorously for Class President (although Vinnie campaigned just for kicks and won).
 Iggy - A hunchbacked student that resembles the archetypical "Igor" type of mad scientist assistant. Iggy has a zipper along the length of his scalp implying he is both hunchback and a Frankenstein-type monster. He tends to forget his brain and is often scolded by Headmistress Crone for this.
 Moorehead - A Metaluna Mutant who is a student in Coach Cadaver's class.
 Nardo - A gargoyle jock who is Vinnie's rival in sports. He is also a student in Coach Cadaver's class.
 Natasha Neckinski - A vampire girl with a European accent, contrasting to the thoroughly Americanized Vinnie and his surfer slang.
 Rover (voiced by Frank Welker) - A dog-boy who speaks in a manner similar to Scooby-Doo.
 Seymour (voiced by Barry Gordon) - A cyclops.
 Suey - A porcine girl. Like Elephant Boy, she vigorously campaigned for Class President. The two performed a Romeo and Juliet-like recital at a talent show, suggesting they are dating.

There are also some unidentified students resembling the monsters from The Brain from Planet Arous, The Crawling Eye, and other films.

Teachers
The bespectacled Mr. Schneider has his hands full with his new students, but he has Gravedale's spooky staff (where some of them initially do not trust Schneider due to his human status but develop a camaraderie with him as the overall story arc develops) to help him out. Like Schneider, each teacher oversees a specific class of students. Gravedale High's staff include:

 Headmistress Crone (voiced by Georgia Brown) - The strict principal who runs the school with an iron albeit easily-detachable left hand. As her name implies, she is a witch-like monster. Her grandfather Cretin Crone founded the school and later passed it on to his son Addlepate. She can be ruthless to trouble-making monsters and faculty who do not toe the line, but is generally an able administrator. Although Headmistress Crone considered herself taking a risk hiring a human teacher, she knows she made the right decision when Schneider disciplines the unruly "misfit" class and now works to give him support.
 Clawford (vocal effects provided by Frank Welker) - Headmistress' Crone's undead cat who is periodically seen hunting and being outwitted by a hunchbacked rat called Bella.
 Boneyard (voiced by Brock Peters) - A lanky white-haired staff member dressed like an undertaker. He fills various roles at Gravedale High including bus driver, driver's ed teacher, and Gravedale Gazette printing press operator. He somewhat resembles the Tall Man from the Phantasm films and is a little reminiscent of Digby O'Dell from The Life of Riley.
 Coach Cadaver (voiced by Jonathan Winters) - A strict hot-headed zombie (his head is stitched together at the top, so his brain is removable) who works as a gym teacher. He is categorized by Crone as a "human-hater." Coach Cadaver dislikes Schneider's students (calling them "misfits") as well as Schneider himself (whose hiring he opposed). His nasty attitude is generally disliked, making him a pariah among the Gravedale faculty as opposed to Schenider's easygoing demeanor.
 Miss Dirge (voiced by Eileen Brennan) - A teacher that resembles the Bride of Frankenstein. She shows mild romantic interest in Schneider, as she admits some monster women find human men attractive. Her name is a play on dirge or mournful funeral song.
 Chef Sal Monella (voiced by Maurice LaMarche) - A monster of unspecified variety who works as a chef in the school cafeteria. Sal takes pride in his filthy kitchen. His name is an obvious pun on salmonella.
 Mr. Tutner (voiced by Tim Curry) - A 5,000 year old mummy history teacher with bad breath who wears sunglasses, a coat, and a tie. Like Cleofatra, Mr. Tutner is pudgy, contrasting the typical association of mummies with sickliness and emaciation. He gets along well with Schneider and tries to compete for a charity fundraising award by attributing his long life to pyramid power as seen in "Monster Gumbo."
 Miss Webner (voiced by Sandra Gould) - As the presence of the word "web" in her name suggests, she is a spider-woman, having six arms and two legs.

Episodes

Cast
 Rick Moranis as Max Schneider
 Shari Belafonte as Blanche
 Eileen Brennan as Miss Dirge
 Georgia Brown as Headmistress Crone
 Tim Curry as Mr. Tutner
 Barry Gordon as Reggie Moonshroud, Seymour
 Sandra Gould as Miss Webner
 Jackie Earle Haley as Gill Waterman
 Ricki Lake as Cleofatra
 Maurice LaMarche as Sid, Chef Sal Monella
 Brock Peters as Boneyard
 Kimmy Robertson as Duzer
 Roger Rose as Vinnie Stoker
 Frank Welker as Frankentyke, J.P. Ghastly, Clawford, Elephant Boy, Rover, Dr. Jekyll and Mr. Hyde
 Jonathan Winters as Coach Cadaver

Additional voices
 Charlie Adler
 Lewis Arquette
 Susan Blu
 Sorrell Booke as Big Daddy (in "Monster Gumbo")
 Pat Buttram as Inspector Nitpicker (in "Save Our School")
 Ruth Buzzi as Miss Fresno (in "Monster on Trial")
 Hamilton Camp as Tucker (in "Goodbye Gravedale")
 Dena Dietrich
 Joan Gerber
 Phil Hartman as Billy Headstone (in "Cleo's Pen Pal")
 David Lander
 Mitzi McCall
 Edie McClurg
 Tom McHugh
 Howard Morris
 Robert Ridgely
 Richard Sanders
 Russi Taylor
 B.J. Ward
 William Woodson as Judge Killjoy (in "Monster on Trial")

Crew
 Gordon Hunt - Recording Director
 Jamie Thomason - Talent Coordinator
 Kris Zimmerman - Animation Casting Director

References

External links
 
 Episode guide at the Big Cartoon DataBase
 DDsite: Gravedale High
 YouTube clips:
 Gravedale High Intro and Theme Song
 Gravedale High Credits

1990s American animated television series
1990s American high school television series
1990s American workplace comedy television series
1990 American television series debuts
1991 American television series endings
American children's animated comedy television series
American children's animated fantasy television series
American children's animated horror television series
English-language television shows
NBC original programming
Television series about educators
Television series about werewolves
Television series by Hanna-Barbera
Television series by Universal Television
Vampires in animated television